= Calif =

Calif may refer to:

- Caliph
- Abbreviation of California
- Calif (company), a subsidiary of French bank Société Générale
